Betamipron (INN) or N-benzoyl-β-alanine is a chemical compound which is used together with panipenem to inhibit panipenem uptake into the renal tubule and prevent nephrotoxicity.

See also 
 Panipenem/betamipron

References 

Benzamides